Charles Edward Walker (14 May 1911 – 7 May 1990) was an English footballer who played as a left-back in the Football League for West Ham United.

Born in Nottingham, Walker started his career at Arsenal. He spent a period on loan to Arsenal's nursery club Margate, but never played a first-team game for Arsenal themselves, with opportunities limited by the presence of England captain Eddie Hapgood. Walker joined West Ham United in 1936, and went on to make 118 league and cup appearances for the east London club.

After the outbreak of World War II, Walker's three Second Division appearances of 1939–40 were expunged from the records. He played in all but one of the Football League War Cup games of that season, leading to victory at Wembley in June 1940. He also played in 27 matches of the Football League South, which ended with West Ham finishing second in both A and C groups. The following season, he made nine League South appearances, and 1941–42 saw him make two appearances each in the League South and the London War Cup. Walker also played for St Mirren during the war, making nine appearances in the Southern League during the 1942–43 season. He saw service with the Royal Air Force and toured the Far East.

Walker played in 21 games of the first peacetime League South season of 1945–46, which included pre-war First and Second Division clubs. His last game for West Ham was a 3–3 away draw against Wolves that season.

After this, Walker rejoined Margate as player-manager for two seasons (winning the Kent League). He then moved to Ashford Town (Kent), where he performed a similar role for the following three seasons (winning the Kent League in his first season). He later managed Ramsgate in a part-time capacity.

Honours
1937–1938 as a Margate player
Southern League Championship winner
Southern League Eastern Section winner
Southern League Central Section winner
Kent Senior Cup Winner
Kent Senior Shield Winner
1939–1940 as a West Ham player
Football League War Cup Final winner
1946–1947 as Margate player/manager
Kent League winner
1947–1948 as Margate player/manager
Kent League winner
Kent League Cup winner
Kent Senior Shield Winner
1948–1949 as Ashford Town player/coach
Kent League winner

Managerial statistics (League Matches)

References

External links
Charlie Walker at westhamstats.info
Charlie Walker at Margate Football Club History
Charlie Walker player profile at Nuts and Bolts archive: History of Ashford Town

1911 births
1990 deaths
Footballers from Nottingham
English footballers
Association football fullbacks
Arsenal F.C. players
Margate F.C. players
West Ham United F.C. players
St Mirren F.C. wartime guest players
Margate F.C. managers
Ashford United F.C. players
Ashford United F.C. managers
Ramsgate F.C. managers
Royal Air Force personnel of World War II
English football managers